The 4 × 400 metres relay (athletics track event) has been included in European Athletics Championships since 1934 in Turin for men and since 1969 in Athens for women. There are 13 countries that have won medals, with Great Britain being the most successful country, with a total of 9 gold and 18 overall medals.

Men

List of medalists

Medal table 

*Germany's medals includes results by West Germany
**Russia's medals includes results by the Soviet Union

Women

List of medalists

Medal table 

*Russia's medals include results by the Soviet Union
**Germany's medals include results by West Germany
***Medals of the Czech republic include results by Czechoslovakia

See also
List of athletics events
Sport of athletics
Track and field

References

Events at the European Athletics Championships
European Championships